Robert P. Kordus (August 1, 1939 – May 23, 2017) was an American politician and businessman.

Biography
Kordus was born on August 1, 1939 in Milwaukee, Wisconsin. He graduated from Casimir Pulaski High School and went to Milwaukee Area Technical College. Kordus was an accountant and an office manager. Kordus had five children, Robert Jr., Peter, Karen, Jan, and Kris. He also had 9 grandchildren, Robert III, Rachel (Robert Jr), Katrina, Lauren, Natalie (Karen), Andrew, Kimberly, Zachary, and Emily (Jan).

Career
Kordus served in the Wisconsin Assembly from 1965 to 1968. He then served on the Milwaukee Common Council from 1968 to 1976. Kordus was a Democrat. He worked for Wisconsin Electric. Kordus died on May 23, 2017.

References

Businesspeople from Milwaukee
Milwaukee Common Council members
Democratic Party members of the Wisconsin State Assembly
Milwaukee Area Technical College alumni
1939 births
2017 deaths
20th-century American businesspeople